Al-Lewaa Club  is a Saudi Arabian football team in Baqaa City playing at the Saudi Second Division.

Ascending to Second Division
He promoted to the Saudi Second Division after the decision of the Saudi Arabian Football Federation to ascend 8 clubs.

Current squad 
As of Saudi Second Division:

References

Lewaa
Lewaa
Lewaa
Lewaa